James Freeborn (11 February 1879 – 23 January 1960) was a Canadian sports shooter. He competed in the 1000 yard free rifle event at the 1908 Summer Olympics.

References

1879 births
1960 deaths
Canadian male sport shooters
Olympic shooters of Canada
Shooters at the 1908 Summer Olympics
Place of birth missing
20th-century Canadian people